Hari Bahadur Khadka is a member of 2nd Nepalese Constituent Assembly. He won Baglung–1 seat in CA assembly, 2013 from Nepali Congress.

References

Nepali Congress politicians from Gandaki Province
Living people
1963 births
Members of the 2nd Nepalese Constituent Assembly